Artem Olegovich Dubrivnyy (born 31 January 1999) is a Russian tennis player.

Dubrivnyy has a career high ATP singles ranking of 409 achieved on 23 September 2019. He also has a career high ATP doubles ranking of 456 achieved on 7 October 2019.

Dubrivnyy made his ATP main draw debut at the 2019 Kremlin Cup after qualifying for the singles main draw, defeating Ilya Ivashka and Filip Horanský.

References

External links

1999 births
Living people
Russian male tennis players
Sportspeople from Taganrog